Osmo Ilmari Kaila (11 May 1916 – 3 June 1991) was a Finnish chess master and chess problemist.

Born in Helsinki, he was twice Finnish Champion (1939, 1954) and thrice Sub-Champion (1947, 1951, 1952).

Kaila took 3rd, behind Gideon Ståhlberg and Erik Lundin, at Oslo 1939 (The 20th Nordic Chess Championship), and won at Copenhagen 1946 (The 21st Nordic Championship).
In 1947, he tied for 7–8th in Helsinki (zonal, Eero Böök and Gösta Stoltz won).
   
He represented Finland in Chess Olympiads:
 In 1936, at seventh board in the 3rd unofficial Chess Olympiad in Munich (+10 –4 =6);
 In 1952, at third board in the 10th Chess Olympiad in Helsinki (+4 –3 =4).

Awarded the IM title in 1952.

References

1916 births
1991 deaths
Finnish chess players
Chess International Masters
Chess Olympiad competitors
Chess composers
20th-century chess players